The 1965 Individual Speedway World Championship was the 20th edition of the official World Championship to determine the world champion rider.

Björn Knutsson won the world title scoring 14 points out of a possible 15 in the final at Wembley with Russian Igor Plekhanov defeating four times champion Ove Fundin in the silver medal run-off.

First round
 British & Commonwealth Qualifying - 32 to British & Commonwealth semi finals
Scandinavian Qualifying - 16 to Nordic Final
Continental Qualifying - 16 to Continental Final

British & Commonwealth Qualifying

Scandinavian Qualifying

Continental Qualifying

Second round
British & Commonwealth semi finals - 16 to British & Commonwealth Final
Scandinavian Final - 8 to European Final
Continental Final - 8 to European Final

British & Commonwealth semi finals

Nordic Final
June 18, 1965
 Skien
 First 8 to European Final

Continental Final
 June 13, 1965
  Wroclaw
 First 8 to European Final plus 1 reserve

Third round
British & Commonwealth Final - 8 to World Final
European Final - 8 to World Final

British & Commonwealth Final
 August 31, 1965
 West Ham
 first 8 to World Final plus 1 reserve

European Final
 June 26, 1965
 Slany
 First 8 to World Final plus 1 reserve

World Final
September 18, 1965
 London, Wembley Stadium

References

1965
Individual Speedway World Championship
Individual Speedway World Championship
Individual Speedway World Championship
Speedway competitions in the United Kingdom